Samuel Richard Davies (9 November 1867 – 17 February 1907) was an English professional footballer, who played as a striker. In 1899, he was, along with Herbert Kilpin, one of the charter members of Italian club A.C. Milan, originally named Milan Foot-Ball and Cricket Club. His son Carlo has been a footballer too.

Honours

Club 
Milan F.B.C.C.
Campionato Federale: 1901

External links 
Profile at MagliaRossonera.it 

1867 births
1907 deaths
English footballers
English expatriate footballers
English people of Welsh descent
Footballers from Manchester
Association football forwards
A.C. Milan players
People from Ardwick
English expatriate sportspeople in Italy
Expatriate footballers in Italy
Association football midfielders